is a Japanese athlete. She competed in the women's high jump at the 1976 Summer Olympics. Following her athletics career, she became a professor of sports science at Hiroshima City University.

See also
List of Asian Games medalists in athletics

References

1952 births
Living people
Place of birth missing (living people)
Japanese female high jumpers
Olympic female high jumpers
Olympic athletes of Japan
Athletes (track and field) at the 1976 Summer Olympics
Asian Games silver medalists for Japan
Asian Games medalists in athletics (track and field)
Athletes (track and field) at the 1974 Asian Games
Medalists at the 1974 Asian Games
Japan Championships in Athletics winners
Japanese schoolteachers
20th-century Japanese women